Eric Meadus (1931–1970) was an English artist whose work was exhibited in the Royal Academy and Paris Salon.

Meadus came from the 'Flower Roads' of Swaythling, a council estate. He was born in Rigby Road, Southampton, but his family soon moved to Lobelia Road. He first exhibited in a mixed show at the City Art Gallery. L.S. Lowry met him in 1965 and encouraged him. He attended King Edward VI School, Southampton and later worked for Pirelli General where he provided cartoons for their house magazine Cable.

His oils were exhibited at the Royal Academy, the Cork Street gallery in London and at the Paris Salon.

Exhibitions

1971: Royal Academy Summer Exhibition.
1996: Southampton City Art Gallery — Meadus line drawings from the permanent collection.
1996: The First Gallery, Southampton.
1999: Tudor House Museum, Southampton.
2001: The First Gallery, Southampton.
2006: The First Gallery, Southampton.
2011: The First Gallery, Southampton.
2014: The First Gallery, Southampton.

External links
Eric Meadus at the First Gallery 
Cutting-edge culture from the suburbs? Yes, council estates and drain covers can be beautiful too, argues Philip Hoare as a new exhibition in Southampton demonstrates (Independent, 2014)

References
 Meadus, Eric. Not a Day Wasted: An Eric Meadus Sketchbook, (Southampton: First Gallery, 1991). .
Meadus, Eric. Southampton: A City Lost ... And Found, (Southampton: First Gallery, 2013)

1931 births
1970 deaths
20th-century English painters
English male painters
People educated at King Edward VI School, Southampton
20th-century English male artists